The following events occurred in December 1924:

December 1, 1924 (Monday)
Communists staged a failed coup attempt in Estonia.
The drama film Romola, starring Lillian Gish, premiered at George M. Cohan's Theatre in New York City.
Boston Arena hosted the first National Hockey League game ever held on American soil when the Boston Bruins defeated the visiting Montreal Maroons, 2 to 1, as both played their first games in franchise history. Smokey Harris scored the first-ever Bruins goal.
The musical Lady, Be Good, with music by George and lyrics by Ira Gershwin, opened at the Liberty Theatre on Broadway.

December 2, 1924 (Tuesday)
A devastating earthquake struck Java, killing 727.
Born: Alexander Haig, United States Secretary of State, in Philadelphia (d. 2010)
Born: Jack Davis, American cartoonist, in Atlanta (d. 2016)
Died: Kazimieras Būga, 45, Lithuanian linguist

December 3, 1924 (Wednesday)
U.S. president Calvin Coolidge delivered his 2nd State of the Union message to the United States Congress. Unlike in 1923, Coolidge delivered a written address instead of giving a speech. The message stated that the present state of the Union "may be regarded with encouragement and satisfaction by every American."
Born: F. Sionil José, novelist, in Rosales, Philippines (alive in 2021)

December 4, 1924 (Thursday)
The trial of confessed serial killer Fritz Haarmann began in Germany.
Died: Cipriano Castro, 66, president of Venezuela from 1899 to 1908

December 5, 1924 (Friday)
Ibn Saud entered Mecca in ihram clothing and performed the umrah.
Benito Mussolini introduced a bill enforcing widespread press censorship.
A first Woolworths Australia department store open in downtown Sydney, as predecessor name was Woolworths Stupendous Bargain Basement.

December 6, 1924 (Saturday)
France rounded up over 300 communists in raids on their headquarters, including some 70 of foreign nationality that were to be deported. "There are too many foreign communists in France who forget their duty to the country that has given them asylum", Prime Minister Édouard Herriot told the Chamber of Deputies. "They are indulging in political demonstrations, and we will not tolerate it, we will not let them meddle in our political life. If we meet with resistance we will break it, and we will deport as many as necessary."
Born: Wally Cox, comedian and actor, in Detroit, Michigan (d. 1973)
Died: Gene Stratton-Porter, 61, American author, screenwriter and naturalist

December 7, 1924 (Sunday)
The Social Democratic Party maintained its plurality in the German federal election.
Born: 
Mário Soares, president of Portugal from 1986 to 1996, and twice its prime minister; in Lisbon (d. 2017)
Bent Fabric (stage name for Bent Fabricus-Bjerre), pianist and composer, in Frederiksberg, Denmark (d. 2020)

December 8, 1924 (Monday)
The Erich von Stroheim-directed film Greed premiered at the Cosmopolitan Theatre in New York City.
The NHL's Bruins-Canadiens rivalry begins at Boston Arena, with a come-from-behind 4-3 win by Montreal over the Bruins.
Died: Xaver Scharwenka, 74, German-Polish pianist, composer and teacher

December 9, 1924 (Tuesday)
A new session of British parliament was opened by George V and Queen Mary. The King's speech included a plan to enlarge the naval base at Singapore.
Born: Manlio Sgalambro, philosopher and writer, in Lentini, Italy (d. 2014)

December 10, 1924 (Wednesday)
The 1924 Nobel Prizes were awarded. The honorees were Manne Siegbahn of Sweden for Physics, Willem Einthoven of the Netherlands (Medicine), and Władysław Reymont of Poland (Literature). No Prize was awarded for Chemistry or Peace this year. 
Died: August Belmont, Jr., 71, American financier and thoroughbred racehorse owner/breeder

December 11, 1924 (Thursday)
Photographer Alfred Stieglitz and painter Georgia O'Keeffe were married in New Jersey.
Born: Hal Brown, baseball player, in Greensboro, North Carolina (d. 2015)

December 12, 1924 (Friday)
Addressing American correspondents at the League of Nations, French politician Aristide Briand said that American entry into the League was essential to ensure world peace.
Born: Ed Koch, mayor of New York City, in the Bronx, New York (d. 2013)

December 13, 1924 (Saturday)
Exiled Albanian political figure Ahmet Zogu invaded Albania with his Yugoslav-backed guerrilla army attempting to overthrow Fan Noli.
Born: Krishna Prasad Bhattarai, political leader, in Kathmandu, Nepal (d. 2011); Robert Coogan, actor, in Glendale, California (d. 1978)
Died: Samuel Gompers, 74, American labor leader

December 14, 1924 (Sunday)
The Henry Kimball Hadley dramatic opera A Night in Old Paris premiered at the Metropolitan Opera House in New York City.
Born: Raj Kapoor, Bollywood famous actor, in Kapoor Haveli, Peshawar (d. 1988)

December 15, 1924 (Monday)
In a letter to British Prime Minister Stanley Baldwin, Winston Churchill opined that Singapore's defences did not need to be completed for another fifteen to twenty years, writing, "I do not believe there is the slightest chance of war with Japan in our lifetime. Japan is at the other end of the world. She cannot menace our vital security in any way." 
Died: Friedrich Trendelenburg, 80, German surgeon

December 16, 1924 (Tuesday)
The Supreme Court of Hungary confiscated the property of former president Mihály Károlyi for high treason. Károlyi was convicted of negotiating with Italy in 1915 to keep the Italians out of the war in exchange for Austrian territory, and for allowing a communist revolution to happen in 1919 by deserting his position.
Born: Loudon Wainwright, Jr., American writer (d. 1988)

December 17, 1924 (Wednesday)
Seven of the eight teams in baseball's American League presented a resolution to commissioner Kenesaw Mountain Landis saying that the "misconduct" of League president Ban Johnson would cease, "or his immediate removal from office will follow." The resolution also declared "that legislation will be adopted that will limit his activities to the internal affairs of the American league." Phil Ball of the St. Louis Browns was the only team owner who did not sign the resolution.
The football club Associação Atlética Portuguesa (RJ) was founded in Brazil.
Born: Margaret Wigiser, baseball player, in Brooklyn, New York (d. 2019)

December 18, 1924 (Thursday)
Pope Pius XI made his first statement against communism after an abandoned pontifical relief mission returned from Russia. He said the Vatican would continue to make efforts to help needy Russians, but "nobody certainly can have thought by our efforts on behalf of the Russian people we intended in any way to lend our support to a system of government which we are so far from approving."

December 19, 1924 (Friday)
German serial killer Fritz Haarmann was sentenced to death for murdering twenty-four young men.<ref>Bischoff, Eva and Siemens, Daniel. "Class, Youth and Sexuality in the Construction of the Lustmörder: The 1928 Murder Trial of Karl Hussmann." Crime and Criminal Justice in Modern Germany. Ed. Richard Wetzell. Berghahn Books, 2014. 222. </ref>
Born: Doug Harvey, hockey player, in Montreal, Quebec, Canada (d. 1989)
 Born: Cicely Tyson, Tony and Emmy Award-winning actor and model, in Harlem, New York City, New York, U.S.A (d. 2021)

December 20, 1924 (Saturday)
Adolf Hitler was released from Landsberg Prison as part of a general amnesty for political prisoners. He returned to his small Munich apartment where his friends threw him a party.
Benito Mussolini presented legislation repealing the much-criticized Acerbo Law.

December 21, 1924 (Sunday)
100 were wounded in rioting between communists and police in Berlin. About 50,000 communists turned into a crushing mob when they gathered to greet Erich Mühsam upon his release from prison in the same general amnesty that freed Hitler.   
Born: Dankwart Rustow, professor of political science and sociology, in Berlin (d. 1996)

December 22, 1924 (Monday)
An interallied military committee headed by Ferdinand Foch decided that troops would not withdraw from the Cologne area on January 10, 1925, as specified in the Treaty of Versailles, because Germany had not fulfilled its disarmament provisions. Angry articles in the German press accused the Allies of breaking the Dawes Pact.

December 23, 1924 (Tuesday)
The F. W. Murnau-directed film The Last Laugh premiered at the Ufa-Palast am Zoo in Berlin.
The Nicolae Bretan opera Golem was first performed at the Hungarian Theater in Cluj, Romania.
German president Friedrich Ebert lost a libel trial in Magdeburg. Newspaper editor Erwin Rothart was sentenced to three months in prison for insulting the president, but his accusation that Ebert had betrayed the country for leading a strike in 1918 was ruled as proven.
Albanian Prime Minister Fan Noli and his ministers fled Tirana as rebel forces led by the deposed leader Ahmet Zogu approached the city.
Born: Bob Kurland, basketball player, in St. Louis, Missouri (d. 2013)

December 24, 1924 (Wednesday)
Pope Pius XI opened the holy door at St. Peter's Basilica to begin the Jubilee Year of 1925.
Albania was declared a republic as Ahmet Zogu entered Tirana without resistance, reclaiming leadership of the country and completing the overthrow of Fan Noli's government.
Eight people died in an Imperial Airways de Havilland DH.34 crash, seconds after taking off from Croydon Airport. It was Britain's worst air disaster to date.
The Babbs Switch fire killed thirty-six people in a one-room school house at Babbs Switch, Oklahoma.
Born: Mohammed Rafi, playback singer, in Kotla Sultan Singh, British India (d. 1980)
Died: David Stewart, 34, British flying ace (pilot in the fatal Imperial Airways de Havilland DH.34 crash)

December 25, 1924 (Thursday)
A post-season college football bowl game known as the Los Angeles Christmas Festival was played in the Los Angeles Memorial Coliseum. The USC Trojans defeated the Missouri Tigers, 20-7.
The Broadway Theatre opened in midtown-Manhattan, New York City.
Born: 
Moktar Ould Daddah, the first president of Mauritania (from 1960 to 1978); in Boutilimit, French West Africa (d. 2003)
Rod Serling, screenwriter, playwright, television producer and narrator known for The Twilight Zone; in Syracuse, New York (d. 1975)
Atal Bihari Vajpayee, 11th prime minister of India from 1998 to 1999; in Gwalior, Gwalior State, British India (d. 2018)

December 26, 1924 (Friday)
Soviet ambassador Leonid Krassin said that Russia would not pay any outstanding debts accrued in the days of the Tsar.
Judy Garland made her show business debut at the age of 2½, singing "Jingle Bells" at her parents' theater in Grand Rapids, Minnesota. 
Died: William Emerson, 81, British architect

December 27, 1924 (Saturday)
An editorial written by the estranged Fascist politician Cesare Rossi ran in Giovanni Amendola's newspaper Il Mondo, simultaneously published in other opposition papers. In it, Rossi claimed that Benito Mussolini had directly ordered the Fascists to carry out several crimes.
During a transfer of 10.5 tonnes dynamite from a cargo ship to freight car, there was an explosion in Temiya railway station, Otaru, Hokkaido, Japan, 94 persons were killed and more than 300 persons were hurt, according to a Japanese government official document figured report.

December 28, 1924 (Sunday)
A general election was conducted in Honduras. Miguel Paz Barahona of the conservative National Party was elected president virtually unopposed, as liberals boycotted the election.
With Franco-German tensions high over the issue of the occupation of Cologne, a sensational report was published in Paris claiming that German scientists had secretly developed a new and devastating poison gas that could annihilate a whole city in a matter of hours.

December 29, 1924 (Monday)
The Herbert Brenon-directed adventure film Peter Pan'', starring Betty Bronson in the title role, was released.
Kid McCoy was found guilty of manslaughter in the August 12 death of his live-in mistress.
Died: Carl Spitteler, 79, Swiss writer and Nobel Prize laureate

December 30, 1924 (Tuesday)
Mussolini called an unexpected cabinet meeting and requested a show of support from all present, which he received from a majority. The two Liberal ministers in Mussolini's cabinet were convinced to withdraw their resignations.
German Foreign Minister Gustav Stresemann told international media that peace in Europe and fulfillment of the Dawes Plan were in danger unless a compromise was reached on the Cologne evacuation issue.

December 31, 1924 (Wednesday)
Thirty-three Blackshirt consuls arrived unannounced in Mussolini's office, demanding that Mussolini crush the opposition or they would do so without him.
Italian police were ordered to search the houses of prominent opposition leaders over allegations that enemies of the government had stockpiled vast stores of arms. Issues of opposition newspapers in several Italian cities were seized, with Florence becoming especially violent as thousands of Blackshirts converged on the city and ransacked several buildings, including the printing plant of an opposition newspaper which was set on fire.
Three of four brothers in the Barmat family of merchants were arrested as the industrial corruption scandal known as the Barmat scandal broke in Germany. One report claimed that President Friedrich Ebert's son "Fritz" was connected to the scandal.
Born: Frank J. Kelley, 50th Michigan Attorney General, in Detroit, Michigan (d. 2021); Taylor Mead, writer, actor and performer, in Grosse Point, Michigan (d. 2013)
Died: Sir Samuel William Knaggs, 68, British civil servant

References

1924
1924-12
1924-12